Adesola Osakalumi  (born in The Bronx, New York) is an American actor, choreographer, singer, and dancer whose talents have garnered him successes in film, television, and stage.

Early life 
Adesola's fascination with dance began as a child. He was surrounded and heavily influenced by the art form at an early age. His mother was a principal dancer with Africa I Dance Theater, a touring company founded by his uncles and subsequently joined by his father. The company's mission was to perpetuate African dance and culture throughout the U.S. and beyond, and it would fuel the young Adesola's motivation to dance, choreograph, and teach. He studied briefly with the Dance Theater of Harlem and while there on a scholarship he learned to integrate his natural ability with routine and regiment and to master the many vocabularies of dance.

Growing up, Adesola was determined to be one of the best poppers and lockers on the scene (popping and locking are forms of "urban social dance" that originated from hip hop culture but have African roots). That wish came true when he was selected to be a part of Rhythm Technicians – a dance crew made up of some of hip hop's best-known B-Boys.  The group gained great popularity in New York by performing regularly throughout the city.

The group later morphed into the GhettOriginals Productions Dance Company (GPDC), the pioneers of hip hop theater. As a co-founder of GPDC, Adesola helped hip-hop dance make a permanent impression on commercial theater. In addition to being the first hip-hop dance group to feature at the esteemed Colorado Dance Festival, GPDC also created the groundbreaking dance production, Jam on the Groove. The production premiered Off-Broadway at the Minetta Lane Theatre in November 1995 and won a Drama Desk Award nomination for Best Choreography. Jam on the Groove went on to tour the US, Europe, South America, and Asia to rave reviews.

In leadership, Adesola has served as Artistic Director for Hip Hop Kung Fu at The Asia Society (featuring hip hop artists from Japan, China, and the US), a board member of Dancing in the Streets, and is a choreographic mentor for Pentacle.

Adesola is best known for his roles in the award-winning Broadway musical FELA!, winning three Tony Awards for Best Choreography, Best Costume Design and Best Sound Design. In 2009, he joined the cast as both a dancer (Area Boy) in the ensemble and as the Fela Kuti understudy. In 2010, he played Fela Kuti four times on Broadway. In the 2011 national tour, he was promoted to play Fela as the alternate lead (playing the character on weekends and on some evenings). When the musical returned to Broadway in July 2012 for a limited engagement, Osakalumi became the main lead and went on to head the cast for the 2013 national tour and garnered rave reviews.

Theater 
Fela!
Equus
Jam on the Groove

Film

Choreography 
Adesola has choreographed and danced in several commercials as well as upfronts for Target, American Express, Panasonic, PBS Kids, Old Navy, ESPN, Fox TV, Advil, Levi 501 Jeans, Halifax Bank, Merck, NV Energy, SAP, and several other companies all over the world. He served as Artistic Director / Co-Choreographer for Centrifugal Force at Lincoln Center's Out of Doors.  He has choreographed for Eyewitness Blues for New York Theatre Workshop; 
Mister at the NY Fringe Festival and New York Theatre Workshop; and Hip Hop Wonderland with Bill Irwin at The New Victory Theatre.

References

External links 
 www.Adesola.com
The New York Times, 'Well Traveled Revolutionary Returns', July 12, 2012
New York Daily News, 'Fela!' star Adesola Osakalumi has role connection to Nigerian musician, political activist, July 23, 2013
VIBE.com, 'Fela's lead talks Kuti's legacy', January 16, 2012
BlackActors.net, 'Exclusive Interview with Adesola Osakalumi', April 2012
ESSENCE.com, 'New and Next: Meet Broadway and 'Fela!' Star, Adesola Osakalumi', July 31, 2012
Jamaica Observer, 'Adesola clings to Ja roots', March 23, 2012
Black Enterprise, “Adesola Osakalumi: Broadway's New 'Fela'!, June 24, 2012
 Barrow, Jerry (July 31, 2012), The Urban Daily. 'Bronx B-Boy Brings Hometown Flavor to 'FELA! Musical [VIDEO]
 Brantley, Ben (July 12, 2012). New York Times Review, 'Well-Traveled Revolutionary Returns”
 Bryson Taylor, Derrick (July 31, 2012), Essence. "New and Next: Meet Broadway and 'Fela!' Star, Adesola Osakalumi
 Coe-Specker, Karla (May 9, 2013), Good Morning Texas 'FELA! Stars Michelle Williams and Adesola Osakalumi'
 Davey D (May 20, 1997), Hip Hop Daily News, Review of Jam on the Groove
 James, Shydel (July 20, 2012). Black Enterprise.  Adesola Osakalumi: Broadway's New 'Fela'
 Johnson, Richard (March 31, 2012). Jamaica Observer 'Adesola clings to Ja roots'
 Miller, Daryl (September 27, 1996), Daily News Theater Review, 'Jam on the Groove' Offers Crash Course in Hip Hop
 Parales, Jon (November 18, 1995), The New York Times, Theater in Review – Jam on the Groove
 Peterman, Christion (April 30, 2012), BlackActors.net 'FELA! Star Adesola Osakalumi Talks Theater'
 Richardson, Clem (July 23, 2012), New York Daily News. "'Fela!' star Adesola Osakalumi has role connection to Nigerian musician, political activist”
 'Fela's lead talks Kuti's Legacy, Importance of the Musical, (January 16, 2012). Vibe.com

American choreographers
American male dancers
Living people
American people of Nigerian descent
American people of Yoruba descent
Yoruba male actors
Male actors from New York (state)
Tony Award winners
Year of birth missing (living people)